WCRX-LP (102.1 FM) was a low-power FM radio station licensed to serve Columbus, Ohio, United States. WCRX-LP was a not-for-profit, volunteer, non-commercial community radio station whose broadcast license was held by the Bexley Public Radio Foundation, a registered 501(c)(3) non-profit corporation. Programming and broadcast operation assistance was provided by Sax Entertainment Music and Media.

Its license was cancelled by the Federal Communications Commission (FCC) on October 2, 2020 for failure to file an application for license renewal.

Programming
Established in March 2007, WCRX-LP broadcast a community radio talk and music format to the greater Columbus, Ohio, area. It broadcast from 3 AM to 3 PM, seven days a week, sharing the frequency with WCRM-LP. Local programming included local news, community events and information, music programming seven days a week with specialty hosted programs, plus local business news and information.

History
After applying to the FCC in January 2001, the station ultimately received its original construction permit from the FCC on October 5, 2005. The new station was assigned the WCRX-LP call sign by the FCC on April 7, 2006. After resolving an engineering amendment to the original permit, WCRX-LP received its license to cover from the FCC on March 21, 2007.

References

External links
 http://www.bexleypublicradio.org
 WCRX-LP Editorial Collective (blog) (as of 2015-05-03 links to new management's WCRX-LP site)
 

CRX-LP
CRX-LP
Radio stations established in 2007
2007 establishments in Ohio
Jazz radio stations in the United States
Radio_stations_disestablished_in_2020
2020 disestablishments in Ohio
CRX-LP 
Defunct radio stations in the United States